Zizi Kodwa (born 19 January 1970) is a South African politician and a Member of Parliament (MP) for the African National Congress.

Since 7 March 2023, he is the current Minister of Sports, Arts and Culture of the Republic of South Africa.

History 

Kodwa began his political career by serving in COSAS in Khayelitsha in the Western Cape where he was a member of the ANC in the 1980s.

He later served in SASCO and was subsequently elected as the SRC Deputy President and later elected SRC President at the University of the Western Cape.

He was also elected to serve in the PEC of the ANCYL in the Western Cape, serving in various portfolios.

He worked at National Office of the ANCYL where he served as Office Manager under the Presidency of Cde Malusi Gigaba and later Cde Fikile Mbalula.

Whilst managing these offices, he was elected to the NEC of the ANCYL.

Upon his election to the NEC, he then headed the Media and Publicity of the ANCYL, where he was subsequently appointed the National Spokesperson of the ANCYL.

After the 2007 ANC National Elective Conference, he was appointed as Head of the Office of the President in Luthuli House and also spokesperson for President Zuma.

In 2010, he was appointed Special Advisor on Communications to the President of South Africa, Jacob Zuma.

In 2012, he was elected to the NEC of the ANC and subsequently appointed National Spokesperson of the ANC.

In 2014, he became an Member of Parliament and was requested to assist in Luthuli House as Head of ANC communications. He resigned as an MP and returned to Luthuli House.

In 2017, he was re-elected ito the NEC of ANC and elected as an NWC member.

After 2017 ANC National Elective Conference, he was appointed Head of Presidency in Luthuli House.

In 2019, he was again elected into National Parliament and subsequently rejoined the Presidency of the Republic of South Africa where he was appointed Deputy Minister in the Presidency responsible for State Security.

Kodwa was appointed as Minister of Sports, Arts and Culture in March 2023.

He currently serves in the NEC Subcommittees for Communication and Peace & Stability.

Kodwa holds a Bachelor of Arts Honours degree from the University of the Western Cape.

He also holds a number of certificates from the National School of Governance.

He is a former part-time Commissioner for the National Youth Commission before it was integrated with Umsobomvu Youth Fund and later became National Youth Development Agency (NYDA)

He is a former Marketing Manager for Denel Swarklip Division.

He also served on the board of trustees of the South Africa International Marketing Council.

References 

Living people
Members of the National Assembly of South Africa
African National Congress politicians
21st-century South African politicians
University of the Western Cape alumni
Politicians from the Western Cape
1970 births
Government ministers of South Africa